Gaëtan Perrin (born 7 June 1996) is a French professional footballer who plays as a midfielder and striker for  club Auxerre.

Career
Perrin is a youth exponent from Lyon. He made his Ligue 1 debut at 14 February 2016 against Stade Malherbe Caen replacing Alexandre Lacazette after 88 minutes in a 4–1 home win. On 19 March 2016, he scored his first professional goal two minutes after having come onto the pitch, thereby helping his club to a 2–0 win against Nantes.

On 9 January 2017, it was announced that Perrin would join Ligue 2 side US Orléans on loan until the end of the season. Nine days later, however, the loan was invalidated by the National Directorate of Management Control's decision to prohibit recruitment by Orléans. The club subsequently sold Jean-Eudes Aholou and appealed the ban. Perrin eventually joined Orléans on a season-long loan on 21 June 2017. In January 2018 the loan was made permanent when Perrin signed a three and a half year contract.

Career statistics

References

Living people
1996 births
Association football midfielders
French footballers
Ligue 1 players
Ligue 2 players
Championnat National players
Championnat National 3 players
Olympique Lyonnais players
US Orléans players
AJ Auxerre players